Classic Hot Tuna Electric is a Hot Tuna album released in 1996 and is an expansion of the B-side of the 1985 vinyl release Historic Live Tuna.  The tracks were recorded at a live electric performance on July 3, 1971 at the Fillmore West auditorium in San Francisco.

The A-side of Historic Live Tuna was expanded as Classic Hot Tuna Acoustic and released at the same time as this album.

Another song from the Fillmore West concert, "Keep Your Lamps Trimmed and Burning", was included in the album Fillmore: The Last Days.

Track listing
"Intro by Bill Graham" / "Never Happen No More" (Blind Blake) – 6:24
"Candy Man" (Rev. Gary Davis) – 5:56
"Keep Your Lamps Trimmed & Burning" (Davis) – 7:39
"Uncle Sam Blues" (Traditional) – 5:40
"John's Other" (Papa John Creach) – 6:00
"Rock Me Baby" (Traditional) – 8:30
"I Know You Rider" (Traditional) – 7:28
"Come Back Baby" (Lightning Hopkins) – 9:14

Personnel
Jorma Kaukonen – guitars, vocals
Jack Casady – bass
Papa John Creach – violin
Sammy Piazza – drums

Production
Michael Falzarano – producer
Leslie D. Kippel – executive producer

References

Albums recorded at the Fillmore
Hot Tuna live albums
1996 live albums
Relix Records live albums